This is a List of World Championships medalists in women's taekwondo.

Finweight
 −43 kg: 1987–1997
 −47 kg: 1999–2007
 −46 kg: 2009–

Flyweight
 −47 kg: 1987–1997
 −51 kg: 1999–2007
 −49 kg: 2009–

Bantamweight
 −51 kg: 1987–1997
 −55 kg: 1999–2007
 −53 kg: 2009–

Featherweight
 −55 kg: 1987–1997
 −59 kg: 1999–2007
 −57 kg: 2009–

Lightweight
 −60 kg: 1987–1997
 −63 kg: 1999–2007
 −62 kg: 2009–

Welterweight
 −65 kg: 1987–1997
 −67 kg: 1999–

Middleweight
 −70 kg: 1987–1997
 −72 kg: 1999–2007
 −73 kg: 2009–

Heavyweight
 +70 kg: 1987–1997
 +72 kg: 1999–2007
 +73 kg: 2009–

Medal table

See also
List of Olympic medalists in taekwondo

References
WTF Medal Winners

Medalists
Taekwondo
World Championships women
World Championships women
Taekwondo